Friederich Ignaz  Mautner (14 May 1921–1996) was an Austrian-American mathematician, known for his research on the representation theory of groups, functional analysis, and differential geometry. He is known for Mautner's Lemma and Mautner's Phenomenon in the representation theory of Lie groups.

Life and career
Following the Anschluss in 1938, Mautner, a Jew, emigrated from Austria to the UK where he became one of the thousands or refugees who were interred by the British and shipped off to Hay Camp 7 in Australia.  While there he was fortunate in that he got to study mathematics under Felix Behrend. When he got back to the UK, he garnered a BSc at Durham University and then went to Ireland in 1944 where he got an assistantship with Paul Ewald at Queens University Belfast (QUB). He then became a scholar at the Dublin Institute for Advanced Studies in 1944–1946. 

He then moved to the USA, where he was a visiting scholar at the Institute for Advanced Study (IAS) in Princeton (1946-47). 

He then attended Princeton University and got a Ph.D. in 1948 with the thesis Unitary Representations of Infinite Groups. 

He was a Guggenheim Fellow at Johns Hopkins University in the academic year 1954-55.

Working in the fields of ergodic theory of geodesic flows, he published a paper in 1957 that established the lemma and the phenomenon that bear his name. 

He published a ground-breaking paper in 1958 that established him as a pioneer in the representation theory of reducible p-adic groups. 

The Mautner Group, a special five-dimensional Lie group, is named after him.

Selected works

with L. Ehrenpreis: 

with L. Ehrenpreis: 
with L. Ehrenpreis:

References

20th-century American mathematicians
Group theorists
1921 births
1996 deaths
Austrian emigrants to the United States
Princeton University alumni
Alumni of King's College, Newcastle